The Rhea–McEntire House, also known as the Rhea–Burleson–McEntire House, is a historic antebellum Greek Revival mansion located along the shoreline of the Tennessee River's Wheeler Lake in Decatur, Alabama.

The house was constructed prior to 1836, and was used as headquarters by both Union and Confederate forces, alternately, during the Civil War.

In 1862, before being occupied by Federal forces, the plans for the Battle of Shiloh were laid out within this building. Because of this, the house was spared when the city was burned, leaving only three other buildings standing in the city.

The official records, most of which are now housed at Tulane University, indicate that General Johnston's headquarters during the time he reorganized his Confederate forces in Decatur in March 1862 were at the McCarty (sic) Hotel. They also indicate that planning for attacking Grant's forces at Pittsburg Landing (the Battle of Shiloh) was done by Johnston's subordinate, General Beauregard, in Corinth, Mississippi.

The list of major buildings in Decatur, Alabama that survived the Civil War were the Dancy-Polk House, the Old State Bank, The McCartney Hotel (demolished in the 1920s), and the Burleson House that later became known as the McEntire House. The most likely reason they were spared is that they were all inside the perimeter of the breastworks built by the Union in 1864. Everything outside the breastworks for an  radius was leveled to provide a clear field of fire for the artillery defending the Union position on the banks of the Tennessee River. The Burlesons owned the house during the Civil War. Dr. Aaron Adair Burleson served as the president of the Tennessee and Central Alabama Railroad that later became part of the Nashville and Decatur Railroad. During the Civil War Dr. Burleson was a physician in the Confederate Army. The home was sold to Jerome Hinds, a former Union soldier from Illinois, in 1869. After the Hinds, the home was used as a boarding house and hotel before standing empty for a period. It was purchased on April 5, 1895 by R. P. McEntire.

The house was also used as the second temporary courthouse, during the construction of the first permanent courthouse in Decatur, in Morgan County.

The house was documented with large-format photographs by the Historic American Buildings Survey in 1937.

See also
National Register of Historic Places listings in Morgan County, Alabama
Battle of Decatur

References

External links

Buildings and structures in Decatur, Alabama
National Register of Historic Places in Morgan County, Alabama
Houses on the National Register of Historic Places in Alabama
Historic American Buildings Survey in Alabama
Alabama in the American Civil War
Greek Revival houses in Alabama
Antebellum architecture
Houses in Morgan County, Alabama